Kerry Goode (born July 28, 1965) is a former professional American football player who played running back for four seasons for the Tampa Bay Buccaneers and Miami Dolphins.

High School Career
Kerry led the Hazlewood Golden Bears to state championships both his junior and senior year while being selected as 2A player of the year in football.

College Career
Goode would go on to play college ball for Alabama where he was named freshman of year in the Southeastern Conference in 1983. 

In the first game of the 1984 Alabama season against Boston College, Goode totaled 297 all-purpose yards with three touchdowns until sustaining a major knee injury in the third quarter that would plague him the rest of his playing days. Many observers believe had it not been for that injury, Goode might have become an all-time great at Alabama.

Pro Career
Goode was drafted in the 7th round and 167th overall of the 1988 NFL Draft by the Tampa Bay Buccaneers who was then coached by his former Alabama coach Ray Perkins. He played in 14 games with five starts for the Bucs in 1988, gaining 231 rushing yards. He played in one game for the 1989 Miami Dolphins, but another knee injury in that one game ended that season for him.

Coaching
He coached for the NFL New York Giants 1993-96, and St. Louis Rams 1997-99.

Personal life
He is brother to Chris Goode, Pierre Goode, and Clyde Goode III, and cousin to Antonio Langham, all of whom played college football at Alabama.

Kerry was diagnosed with Amyotrophic Lateral Sclerosis (Lou Gehrig disease) in 2015.

References

1965 births
American football running backs
Tampa Bay Buccaneers players
Miami Dolphins players
Alabama Crimson Tide football players
Living people
People from Town Creek, Alabama
People with motor neuron disease